Analamazaotra National Park is a national park of Madagascar. The park is in the eastern portion of Madagascar's Central Highlands. The neighbouring Analamazaotra Forest Station is a local reforestation effort. It adjoins Andasibe-Mantadia National Park to the north. 

The reserve is situated in the region Alaotra-Mangoro, close to Moramanga and Andasibe.

Analamazaotra National Park is located 27 km from Moramanga and is bordered on the south by National road 2, a secondary road to Andasibe and a railway line between Antananarivo and Toamasina.

Conservation
Analamazaotra Special Reserve, also known as Périnet-Analamazaotra, was established in 1970. On 21 April 2015 the special reserve was combined with the adjacent Analamazaotra Forest Station to create Analamazaotra  National Park via Decree No. 2015-732.

References

External links
Association Mitsinjo

Alaotra-Mangoro
National parks of Madagascar
Madagascar subhumid forests